The 2010 Fremantle Football Club season was the club's 16th season of competition in the Australian Football League (AFL).  The club reached the finals for the third time and won its first ever Elimination Final, beating Hawthorn at Subiaco Oval before losing to Geelong at the MCG to end the season.

Personnel changes
Fremantle was not a major participant in the trade period, with no recruits and only fringe players Brett Peake and Marcus Drum traded for late third round selections.  In the draft, however, Fremantle would recruit two significant members of its future midfield in Nathan Fyfe and Michael Barlow, as well as the injury prone Anthony Morabito.  Adam McPhee returned to the club via the pre-season draft after spending the seven previous seasons with Essendon.

Dean Solomon retired during the pre-season due to a recurrence of a past knee injury.  Scott Thornton announced his retirement mid year after breaking his leg whilst playing for South Fremantle. Paul Hasleby declared prior to the final home and away game that he would retire at the end of the season.

Off-field, Rick Hart stepped down as president at the end of the 2009 season, with Steve Harris his successor. Ben Allen was reappointed as the member's elected representative, and inaugural Docker Stephen O'Reilly and Jenn Morris, a dual Olympic gold medalist with the Hockeyroos, appointed to the board.

During the season

Additions
Traded to Fremantle:
 None
2009 National draft:
 Anthony Morabito (Peel Thunder, #4)
 Nathan Fyfe (Claremont, #20)
 Joel Houghton (Perth, #36)
 Jesse Crichton (North Launceston, #48)
 Dylan Roberton (Dandenong Stingrays, #49)
 Justin Bollenhagen (South Adelaide, #52)
Pre-season draft
 Adam McPhee (Essendon, #3)
Rookie draft:
 Michael Barlow (Werribee, #8)
 Alex Silvagni (Casey Scorpions, #24)
Rookie elevation:
 Greg Broughton

Departures
Retired
Andrew Browne
Dean Solomon

Delisted: 
Adam Campbell
Andrew Foster
Daniel Gilmore
Josh Head
Luke Pratt (rookie)
Brent Connelly (rookie)

Traded away:
  Brett Peake to St Kilda for selection 48
 Marcus Drum to Geelong for selection 49

Ladder

2010 results

NAB Cup

Premiership season

Finals

Awards, records and milestones
Aaron Sandilands was named as the lead ruckman in the 2010 All-Australian team, his third selection. Matthew Pavlich was considered unlucky to have not been selected for his seventh All-Australia team.  Michael Barlow was awarded the Ross Glendinning Medal in Round 6, with Sandilands winning it in Round 18.  Barlow, despite only playing 13 games for the season due to suffering a broken leg in Round 14, was also awarded the Best First Year Player Award by the AFL Players Association awards.

Nathan Fyfe and Anthony Morabito both received nominations in the 2010 AFL Rising Star award, Fyfe in Fremantle's round 9 win over Sydney and Morabito in the final round against Carlton.

Garrick Ibbotson and Paul Duffield were chosen to represent Australia in the 2010 International Rules series in Ireland.

Club awards
David Mundy won his first Doig Medal, awarded at a function at the Burswood Entertainment Complex on 3 October.  Votes were awarded to each player by the coaches after each game.

 Doig Medal: David Mundy, 190 votes
 2nd: Aaron Sandilands, 171 votes
 3rd: Matthew Pavlich,  160 votes
 4th Stephen Hill, 137 votes
 5th: Greg Broughton, 116 votes
 6th: Hayden Ballantyne, 103 votes
 7th: Michael Barlow, 97 votes
 8th: Luke McPharlin, 80 votes
 9th: Roger Hayden, 78 votes
 10th: Chris Tarrant, 76 votes
 Best Clubman: Matt de Boer
 Beacon Award: Michael Barlow

Milestones
 Round 5 - Paul Duffield (50 AFL games)
 Round 11 - Steven Dodd (100 AFL games)
 Round 13 - Paul Hasleby (200 AFL games)
 Round 13 - Garrick Ibbotson (50 AFL games)
 Round 15 - Aaron Sandilands (150 AFL games)
 Round 18 - Luke McPharlin (150 Fremantle games)
 Round 21 - Michael Johnson (100 AFL games)

Debuts

References

External links
Official Fremantle Football Club website
Fremantle Football Club statistics at AFL Tables

Fremantle Football Club
Fremantle Football Club seasons
Fremantle Football Club